Metamorpheus is Steve Hackett's 17th studio album. This classical album is the successor to A Midsummer Nights Dream. Metamorpheus is an expression on Orpheus and his passage through the Underworld.

The cover of the album was created by Kim Poor, the picture on the sleeves of the previous album To Watch The Storms also features the song "Rebecca".

This album makes use of themes first used by Hackett in short pieces (only released as free MP3 downloads) for the soundtrack of the 2001 Showtime documentary Outwitting Hitler.

Track listing 
 "The Pool of Memory and the Pool of Forgetfulness" – 2:15
 "To Earth Like Rain" – 1:33
 "Song to Nature" – 3:02
 "One Real Flower" – 3:12
 "The Dancing Ground" – 3:02
 "That Vast Life" – 12:27
 "Eurydice Taken" – 1:48
 "Charon's Call" – 3:15
 "Cerberus at Peace" – 2:06
 "Under the World – Orpheus Looks Back" – 5:16
 "The Broken Lyre" – 3:17
 "Severance" – 3:05
 "Elegy" – 3:18
 "Return to the Realm of Eternal Renewal" – 2:56
 "Lyra" – 6:36

Facts 
 This is the first album where limited copies of the Electronic Press Kit for the album were released for purchase on the Camino Records website.

Personnel 
 Steve Hackett – guitars
 John Hackett – flute, piccolo, guitar, orchestral arrangements
 Dick Driver – double bass	
 Lucy Wilkins – violin
 Richard Stewart – cello
 Sara Wilson – cello
 Richard Kennedy – French horn
 Colin Clague – trumpet

Production 
 Benedict Tobias Fenner – engineer
 Roger King – engineer, mastering, mixing, orchestral arrangements
 Jerry Peal – engineer, contribution
 Harry Pearce – design
 Kim Poor – cover painting

References 

2005 albums
Steve Hackett albums
Orpheus